Made in U.S.A is a 1966 French crime comedy film directed by Jean-Luc Godard, starring Anna Karina, Marianne Faithfull and Jean-Pierre Léaud. It was inspired by the Howard Hawks film The Big Sleep—in turn based on the novel of the same name by Raymond Chandler—and unofficially based on the novel The Jugger, by Richard Stark (an alias of Donald E. Westlake).

Because neither Godard nor the producer paid the book's adaptation rights and following legal action by Westlake, the film was long unavailable in the United States. The film had its U.S. premiere on April 1, 2009 (three months after Westlake's death) at the Castro Theatre in San Francisco in a newly restored print distributed by Rialto Pictures. Criterion released the film on DVD in July 2009.

Premise
Paula Nelson goes to Atlantic-Cité to meet her lover, Richard Politzer, at an unknown point in the future (possibly 1969). Once there, she learns that Richard is dead and decides to investigate. In her hotel room she meets Typhus, whom she ends up knocking out. His corpse is later found in the apartment of writer David Goodis. Paula is arrested and interrogated. From then on, she encounters many gangsters.

Cast
 Anna Karina as Paula Nelson
 Jean-Pierre Léaud as Donald Siegel
 László Szabó as Richard Widmark
 Ernest Menzer as Edgar Typhus
 Kyôko Kosaka as Doris Mizoguchi
 Yves Afonso as David Goodis
 Marc Dudicourt as barman
 Sylvain Godet as Robert MacNamara
 Jean-Claude Bouillon as Inspector Aldrich
 Philippe Labro as himself

Background
The film was shot at the same time as Two or Three Things I Know About Her. Godard did it to help his friend and producer, Georges de Beauregard, through difficulties after the censorship of The Nun (1966), a film by Jacques Rivette, that he produced.

This is the last full-length film on which Karina and Godard collaborated. He again directed her in a segment ("Anticipation, ou: l'amour en l'an 2000" (Anticipation: or Love in the Year 2000)) of the film The Oldest Profession (1967).

Marianne Faithfull has a cameo in a cafe scene where she sings "As Tears Go By".

Characters in the film are named for such real-life personages as Don Siegel, Kenji Mizoguchi, Richard Widmark, Robert McNamara, David Goodis, and Richard Nixon.  Paula Nelson is probably named for Baby Face Nelson, about whom Siegel had made a film starring Mickey Rooney.

The film is dedicated to "Nick and Sam", referring to Nicholas Ray and Samuel Fuller, "Hollywood mavericks who were objects of filial awe and Oedipal aggression" for Godard.

Reception 

Made in U.S.A "has rarely been seen in the U.S.A."; it was shown at the 1967 New York Film Festival, prompting The New York Times to call it an "often bewildering potpourri of film narration, imagery and message" and point out that "Anna Karina, as the questing girl friend, supplies not only a luminous beauty but also a unifying thread of humanity." Over forty years later, A.O. Scott saw it at Film Forum and said while it is "far from a lost masterpiece, it is nonetheless a bright and jagged piece of the jigsaw puzzle of Mr. Godard’s career"; he suggested a number of "reasons for non-Godardians" to see the film:

There is, for one thing, a pouting and lovely Marianne Faithfull singing an a capella version of 'As Tears Go By.' There are skinny young men smoking and arguing. There are the bright Pop colors of modernity juxtaposed with the weathered, handsome ordinariness of Old France, all of it beautifully photographed by Raoul Coutard. There are political speeches delivered via squawk box.  And of course there is a maddening, liberating indifference to conventions of narrative coherence, psychological verisimilitude or emotional accessibility.

The film holds a rating of 89% on Rotten Tomatoes.

References

External links
 
 
 Made in U.S.A. from Rialto Pictures
 Made in U.S.A. from Film Forum, including a January 2008 Q & A with co-star László Szabó
Made in U.S.A: The Long Goodbye an essay by J. Hoberman at the Criterion Collection

1966 films
1966 comedy films
1966 crime films
1960s avant-garde and experimental films
1960s comedy mystery films
1960s crime comedy films
Films based on American novels
Films based on works by Donald E. Westlake
Films directed by Jean-Luc Godard
Films set in France
Films set in the future
French avant-garde and experimental films
French comedy mystery films
French crime comedy films
1960s French-language films
Films set in Atlantic City, New Jersey
1960s French films
Foreign films set in the United States